William Hollis was born 1816 in Lewisham, South London. He was an English cricketer who played seven first-class matches for Kent and the Marylebone Cricket Club in the 1840s.

References 

1816 births
Year of death unknown
People from Lewisham
Kent cricketers
English cricketers
Marylebone Cricket Club cricketers